Phyllomys is a genus of arboreal spiny rat, geographically restricted to the forests of eastern Brazil.

Phylogeny 
Phyllomys is the sister genus to Echimys, and then to Makalata. These taxa are closely related to the genera Pattonomys and Toromys.
In turn, these five genera share phylogenetic affinities with a clade containing the bamboo rats Dactylomys, Olallamys, Kannabateomys together with Diplomys and Santamartamys.

Systematics 
There are thirteen named species in the genus.  These species have frequently been placed in the genus Echimys.

Phyllomys blainvilii – golden Atlantic tree-rat
Phyllomys brasiliensis – orange-brown Atlantic tree-rat
Phyllomys dasythrix – drab Atlantic tree-rat
Phyllomys kerri – Kerr's Atlantic tree-rat
Phyllomys lamarum – pallid Atlantic tree-rat
Phyllomys lundi – Lund's Atlantic tree-rat
Phyllomys mantiqueirensis – Mantiqueira Atlantic tree-rat
Phyllomys medius – long-furred Atlantic tree-rat
Phyllomys nigrispinus – black-spined Atlantic tree-rat
Phyllomys pattoni – rusty-sided Atlantic tree-rat
Phyllomys sulinus – Southern Atlantic tree-rat
Phyllomys thomasi – giant Atlantic tree-rat
Phyllomys unicolor – short-furred Atlantic tree-rat

References 

 
Taxa named by Peter Wilhelm Lund
Rodent genera